The Homer in the Gloamin'  is one of the most famous home runs in baseball folklore, hit by Gabby Hartnett of the Chicago Cubs near the end of the 1938 Major League Baseball season. The expression was a play on the popular song, "Roamin' in the Gloamin'" and was used in the lead paragraph of a story about the game written by Earl Hilligan for the Associated Press.

The play
The Pittsburgh Pirates had led the National League for much of the 1938 season, but when the final month of the season came, the Pirates began to falter. By the time they came to Chicago late in September for a three-game series, the Chicago Cubs were one and a half games behind the Pirates in the standings. The Cubs won the first game of the series 2–1, behind the pitching of Dizzy Dean, who a year after an arm injury was past his prime. Dean relied on his experience and grit to defeat the Pirates and would later call it the greatest outing of his career. The victory cut the Pirates' lead to a half game and set the stage for one of baseball's most memorable moments.

The game on September 28, 1938, reached the bottom of the ninth inning with the score tied at five runs apiece. With darkness descending on a Wrigley Field that would not have artificial lighting for another 50 years, the umpires ruled that the ninth inning would be the last to be played. At the time, suspended game rules did not provide for suspending games due to darkness. The game would have to have been replayed in its entirety the following day, prior to the scheduled third game of the series. Hartnett came to bat with two outs in the bottom of the ninth inning. With a count of 0 balls and 2 strikes, Hartnett connected on a Mace Brown pitch, launching the ball into the darkness. Before it eventually landed in the left-center field bleachers for a game-winning home run, the stadium erupted into pandemonium as players and fans stormed the field to escort Hartnett around the bases.

Aftermath
As a result of the shot, the Cubs vaulted into first place. They won the next day's scheduled game over the Pirates 10–1, completing a three-game sweep of the Bucs, and would clinch the pennant in St. Louis three days later. The Cubs would finish the season 89–63, with the Pirates two games behind at 86–64. That was the high point of the Cubs season, as they were swept in the 1938 World Series by the New York Yankees, their fourth World Series loss in ten years.

For the Pirates, 1938 marked the closest they would come to going to the World Series between 1927 and 1960, as the team would slip to sixth place the following year, with average seasons in the early 1940s and a late pennant race in 1948 only to become one of baseball's worst teams from 1949 until 1956, not contending for the National League pennant again until the late 1950s.

"Roamin' in the Gloamin'" was a popular song dating to 1911, written and recorded by Harry Lauder. "Gloaming" is a regional dialect term of Scots origin denoting "twilight". Writers picked up on these facts and Hartnett's clutch hit became known in Cubs lore as the "Homer in the Gloamin'".

References

External links
1938: A Rockier Road
Cubs game log for 1938
 Jack Bales, "The Homer in the Gloamin'," WrigleyIvy.com.
Pirates game log for 1938

Major League Baseball games
Chicago Cubs
1938 Major League Baseball season
September 1938 sports events
Historic baseball plays